Marston Records is an independent American record label. The label specializes in the remastering and reissuing of very early and rare recordings. It was founded in 1997 by Ward Marston and Scott Kessler.

Releases on Marston Records 

Collections of rare recordings of singers include Jane Bathori, Mattia Battistini, Celestina Boninsegna, Max Bouvet, Rosalia Chalia, Feodor Chaliapin, Arthur Endrèze, Emilio de Gogorza, Lotte Lehmann, Félia Litvinne, Fernando De Lucia, John McCormack, Léon Melchissédec, Maurice Renaud, Tito Schipa, Conchita Supervía, Vanni-Marcoux, César Vezzani and Francisco Viñas. Collections of pianists' rare recordings include Josef Hofmann, Raoul von Koczalski, Jorge Bolet and Vladimir de Pachmann.

References 

Classical music record labels
American independent record labels
Record labels established in 1997
American companies established in 1997